Mithrenes (Armenian: Միհրան) is also mentioned as Mithras, High Priest of the temple to the Sun at Armavir. Whether he ever ruled as a king is not known, although later kings such as Tigran were both high priest and king.

References 
Professor David Marshall Lang

Orontid dynasty